Gareth Brooks (born 28 February 1979 in Christchurch) is a field hockey player from New Zealand, who earned his first cap for the national team, nicknamed The Black Sticks, in 2002. The midfielder was a member of the team that finished sixth at the 2004 Summer Olympics in Athens, Greece.

International Senior tournaments
 2003 – Sultan Azlan Shah Cup
 2003 – Champions Challenge
 2004 – Olympic Qualifier
 2004 – Olympic Games
 2004 – Champions Trophy
 2005 – Sultan Azlan Shah Cup
 2006 – Commonwealth Games
 2006 – World Cup
 2008 – Olympic Games

References

External links
 

New Zealand male field hockey players
Male field hockey midfielders
Olympic field hockey players of New Zealand
Field hockey players at the 2004 Summer Olympics
Field hockey players at the 2006 Commonwealth Games
2006 Men's Hockey World Cup players
Field hockey players at the 2008 Summer Olympics
Field hockey players from Christchurch
1979 births
Living people
Commonwealth Games competitors for New Zealand